The Hermite or Pólya class is a set of entire functions satisfying the requirement that if E(z) is in the class, then:

E(z) has no zero (root) in the upper half-plane.
 for x and y real and y positive.
 is a non-decreasing function of y for positive y.

The first condition (no root in the upper half plane) can be derived from the third plus a condition that the function not be identically zero. The second condition is not implied by the third, as demonstrated by the function  In at least one publication of Louis de Branges, the second condition is replaced by a strict inequality, which modifies some of the properties given below.

Every entire function of Hermite class can be expressed as the limit of a series of polynomials having no zeros in the upper half-plane.

The product of two functions of Hermite class is also of Hermite class, so the class constitutes a monoid under the operation of multiplication of functions.

The class arises from investigations by Georg Pólya in 1913 but some prefer to call it the Hermite class after Charles Hermite.
A de Branges space can be defined on the basis of some "weight function" of Hermite class, but with the additional stipulation that the inequality be strict – that is,  for positive y.

The Hermite class is a subset of the Hermite–Biehler class, which does not include the third of the above three requirements.

A function with no roots in the upper half plane is of Hermite class if and only if two conditions are met: that the nonzero roots zn satisfy

(with roots counted according to their multiplicity), and that the function can be expressed in the form of a Hadamard product

with c real and non-positive and Im b non-positive. (The non-negative integer m will be positive if E(0)=0. Even if the number of roots is infinite, the infinite product is well defined and converges.)

Assume  is a non-constant polynomial of Hermite class. If its derivative is zero at some point  in the upper half-plane, then

near  for some complex number  and some integer  greater than 1. So the derivative is a polynomial with no root in the upper half-plane, that is, of Hermite class. Since a non-constant function of Hermite class is the limit of a sequence of such polynomials, its derivative will be of Hermite class as well.

Louis de Branges showed a connexion between functions of Hermite class and analytic functions whose imaginary part is non-negative in the upper half-plane (UHP), often called Nevanlinna functions. If a function E(z) is of Hermite-Biehler class and E(0) = 1, we can take the logarithm of E in such a way that it is analytic in the UHP and such that log(E(0)) = 0. Then E(z) is of Hermite class if and only if

(in the UHP).

Laguerre–Pólya class
A smaller class of entire functions is the Laguerre–Pólya class, which consists of those functions which are locally the limit of a series of polynomials whose roots are all real. Any function of Laguerre–Pólya class is also of Hermite class. Some examples are

Examples
From the Hadamard form it is easy to create examples of functions of Hermite class. Some examples are:
A non-zero constant.

Polynomials having no roots in the upper half plane, such as 
 if and only if Re(p) is non-negative
 if and only if p is a non-negative real number
any function of Laguerre-Pólya class: 
A product of functions of Hermite class

References

Analytic functions